Pierre Sagna (11 July 1932 − 24 May 2008) was a Senegalese Roman Catholic bishop.

Ordained to the priesthood in 1959, Sagna was named bishop of Roman Catholic Diocese of Saint-Louis du Sénégal, Senegal in 1974 and resigned in 2003.

References 

1932 births
2008 deaths
People from Ziguinchor
20th-century Roman Catholic bishops in Senegal
Roman Catholic bishops of Saint-Louis du Sénégal